Dumaria is a village in Naugarh Block of Chandauli District of Eastern Uttar Pradesh in North India.
Co-ordinates : 24.8298838°N, 83.2088458,696°E
ZIP Code : 232111.

References

Villages in Chandauli district